Khan Kandi (also Romanized as Khān Kandī; also known as Khānazar and Khānīverdī) is a village in Gerdeh Rural District, in the Central District of Namin County, Ardabil Province, Iran. At the 2006 census, its population was 278, in 58 families.

References 

Towns and villages in Namin County